Elizabeth Lake  is a natural sag pond that lies directly on the San Andreas Fault in the northern Sierra Pelona Mountains, in northwestern Los Angeles County, southern California.

Geography

It is a natural perennial lake, but may dry up entirely during drought years. It is south of the western Antelope Valley.

Elizabeth Lake is one of a series of sag ponds created by the motion of the Earth's tectonic plates along the San Andreas Fault in the area, with others including Hughes Lake and the Munz Lakes.  They are part of the northern upper Santa Clara River watershed.

The community of Elizabeth Lake is on the shore of the lake.  It is administratively within the unincorporated community of Lake Hughes, and shares the same zip code.

History

Nomenclature
In 1780, the Spanish explorer-priest Junipero Serra named the lake La Laguna de Diablo (English: Devil's Lake),  because some who lived nearby believed that within it dwelt a pet of the devil, which later came to be known as the Elizabeth Lake Monster. The creature is said to resemble a dragon, with leathery wings and scaly skin.

Sometime after 1834, the lake was called La Laguna de Liebre (English: Rabbit Lake) for a short time.  Then in the 1840s it became known as La Laguna de Chico Lopez, for Francisco "Chico" Lopez, who grazed cattle on its banks.

Native American
Elizabeth Lake once marked a dividing point between the territories of the Tataviam, Kitanemuk, and Serrano tribes of Native Americans. The Tataviam may have called it Kivarum.

Spain and Mexico
As early as the 1780s, the main inland route between southern and northern Spanish colonial Las Californias province was El Camino Viejo a Los Ángeles (English: the Old Road to Los Angeles). It became a well established inland route, and an alternative to the coastal El Camino Real trail used since the 1770s. Locally, it ascended the Sierra Pelona Mountains via San Francisquito Canyon, crossed through San Francisquito Pass, ran north to the lake, and then skirted it and continued northwest to Aguaje Lodoso (Mud Spring) in the Antelope Valley and westward to Cow Springs and the Cuddy Valley, and then down Cuddy Canyon to the San Joaquin Valley.

Another inland route diverged from the El Camino Viejo at Elizabeth Lake, going north to cross the western Antelope Valley and then up Cottonwood Creek canyon, to cross over the Tehachapi Mountains via Old Tejon Pass, and down Tejon Creek canyon to the San Joaquin Valley. After 1843, much of that section was within the Mexican Alta California land grant of Rancho Tejon. From 1849 to before 1854, it was the main road connecting the southern part of the state to the trail along the eastern side of the San Joaquin Valley to the goldfields to the north.

The Mexican land grant Rancho La Liebre was established in 1846 in Alta California, with its southeastern section in the Sierra Pelona Mountains near the lake.

United States
In the early 1850s, the vicinity of La Laguna de Chico Lopez was a frequent haunt of California grizzly bears—so numerous that cattle ranching was considered impossible.

In 1854, the route to the San Joaquin Valley shifted away from the Old Tejon Pass route to the Stockton - Los Angeles Road, using the Fort Tejon Pass, and the Grapevine Canyon. The later Butterfield Overland Mail shortened the route to Cow Springs avoiding Mud Springs, skirting Elizabeth Lake to its north westward via the San Andreas Rift to Oakgrove Canyon then north via Pine Canyon to Antelope Valley and westward again to Cow Springs.

The first building at the lake was La Casa de Miguel Ortiz, an adobe built by Miguel Ortiz, a muleteer, on land given him by his employer, Edward Fitzgerald Beale. Southwest of the Ortiz Adobe was the Andrada Stage Station adobe, sited where the old Fort Tejon Road entered San Francisquito Canyon.

In 2013, wildfires swept through the Lake Elizabeth area. The lake has been dry ever since 2013, unrelated to the fire but because of a drought.

Education
In 1869, the Los Angeles County Board of Supervisors designated the Elizabeth Lake School District to serve the area, which had the only established school between Los Angeles and Bakersfield. Land for the school was donated by Samuel and Almeda Frakes from their ranch lands. Children from the Lake Hughes, Elizabeth Lake, and Green Valley areas are still served by this school district. The 1869 wooden schoolhouse lasted until it was replaced by an adobe structure in the early 1930s, located on the east side of Elizabeth Lake Road, ¼ mile north of Andrada Corner at the intersection of San Francisquito and Elizabeth Lake Roads.

Lake Hughes
In 1924, Judge Hughes renamed the sag pond to the west of Elizabeth Lake to Lake Hughes, and created a recreational resort area around it.

See also
 Elizabeth Lake, California — community on lake
 List of lakes in California
  – related topics

References

External links
 
 Weird California - The Monster of Elizabeth Lake
  Abobes of Rancho La Liebre

Lakes of Los Angeles County, California
Santa Clara River (California)
Sierra Pelona Ridge
Angeles National Forest
El Camino Viejo
Lakes of California
Lakes of Southern California